African Queen was built in the East Indies in 1775, probably under a different name. She first appeared in Lloyd's Register (LR) as African Queen in 1787. She made one voyage as a slave ship and then sailed between England and North America. She foundered in 1793.

Career
Captain Cobb Taylor sailed from London on 25 May 1787, bound for West Africa. African Queen gathered her slaves at New Calabar. She arrived at Kingston, Jamaica 12 February 1788. She had arrived with 466 slaves and she landed 451. She left Kingston on 5 May, and arrived back at London on 8 July.

Captain James Downey (or Downie) replaced Captain Cobb c. 1788. On 12 February 1793 African Queen, Downie, master, was at Deal when a gale drove her into Tom, Smith, master. African Queen was on her way to Sierra Leone and Tom was on her way to Liverpool. Tom lost her mizzenmast and African Queen lost her jib and boom, and sustained substantial damage.

Fate
On 12 August a hurricane hit Nevis. African Queen drove out to sea, where she foundered.

Lloyd's Register

Citations

1775 ships
London slave ships
Age of Sail merchant ships of England
Maritime incidents in 1793